Razgrad is a city in Northeastern Bulgaria in the valley of the Beli Lom river that falls within the historical and geographical region of Ludogorie (Deliorman). It is an administrative center of Razgrad Province.

Etymology

The suffix "grad" means city in Bulgarian, while the origin and the meaning of the first part "raz" is obscure. 
During the Second Bulgarian Empire, around the present city there was a settlement, mentioned by the names of Hrasgrad, Hrazgrad and Hrizgrad'''. These names come from the name of the Bulgar and Slavic god Hors.

History

Razgrad was built upon the ruins of the Ancient Roman town of Abritus on the banks of the Beli Lom river. Abritus was built on a Thracian settlement of the 4th-5th century BC of unknown name. Several bronze coins of the Thracian king Seuthes III (330-300 BC) and pottery were found, as well as artifacts from other rulers and a sacrificial altar of Hercules.

Some of Razgrad's landmarks include the Varosha architectural complex from the 19th century, the ethnographic museum and several other museums, the distinctive Razgrad clock tower in the centre built in 1864, the St Nicholas the Miracle Worker Church from 1860, the Momina cheshma'' sculpture, the Mausoleum Ossuary of the Liberators (1879–1880) and the Ibrahim Pasha Mosque from 1530. The mosque is said to be one of the largest in the Balkans.

In 251, the town was the site of the Battle of Abrittus, during which the Goths defeated a Roman army under the emperors Trajan Decius and Herennius Etruscus. The battle is notable for being the first occasion of a Roman emperor being killed in a battle with barbarians.

Razgrad Peak on Greenwich Island in the South Shetland Islands, Antarctica is named after Razgrad.

Population 
In January 2012, Razgrad was inhabited by 33,416 people within the city limits, while the Razgrad Municipality with the legally affiliated adjacent villages had 50,457 inhabitants. The number of the residents of the city (not the municipality) reached its peak in the period 1988-1991 when exceeded 55,000. The following table presents the change of the population after 1887.

Ethnic composition
According to the latest 2011 census data, the individuals declared their ethnic identity were distributed as follows:
 Bulgarians: 24,701 (79.1%)
 Turks: 5,902 (18.9%)
 Roma: 288 (0.9%)
 Others: 140 (0.4%)
 Indefinable: 195 (0.6%)
 Undeclared: 2,654 (7.8%)
Total: 33,880

The Razgrad Province has the second largest Turkish population in Bulgaria behind the Kardzhali Province, though the municipality and the city of Razgrad have a lower proportion of Turks than the rest of the province.

Sport
Razgrad is widely recognizable for being home to the association football club Ludogorets Razgrad, who in recent years have become the dominant force in Bulgarian football after winning eleven consecutive Bulgarian First League titles between 2012 and 2022. After reaching the UEFA Europa League round of 16 during the 2013–14 season, the club also made their UEFA Champions League debut appearance a season later. Ludogorets play their home matches at Ludogorets Arena, a venue with a capacity for 10,500 people.

Geography

Climate

Notable people
 Sofu Mehmed Pasha (died 1626), Ottoman administrator
 Ivan Ivanov Bagryanov (1891–1945), Bulgarian politician who briefly served as Prime Minister
 Petar Gabrovski (1898–1945), Bulgarian politician who briefly served as Prime Minister 
 Dimitar Nenov (1901–1953), Bulgarian classical pianist, composer, music pedagogue and architect
 Boncho Novakov (born 1935), Bulgarian former cyclist
 Osman Duraliev (1939–2011), Bulgarian freestyle wrestler
 Ali Dinçer (1945–2007), Turkish politician, former Mayor of Ankara and former government minister 
 Emanuil Dyulgerov (born 1955), Bulgarian former athlete
 Stoycho Stoev (born 1962), Bulgarian former footballer and manager
 Diyan Angelov (born 1964), Bulgarian former football player
 Mecnur Çolak (born 1967), Turkish former footballer
 Nikolay Antonov (born 1968), Bulgarian former athlete
 Şoray Uzun (born 1968), Turkish comedian, writer and television host
 Neriman Özsoy (born 1988), Turkish female volleyball player

Twin towns and sister cities

Razgrad is twinned with:

  Oryol, Russia (since 1968)
  Szombathely, Hungary (since 1992)
  Wittenberge, Germany (since 2001)
  Armagh, Northern Ireland, United Kingdom (since 1995)
  Châlons-en-Champagne, France (since 1975)
  Avcılar, Istanbul, Turkey (since 2000)
  Yangzhou, People's Republic of China (since 2000)
  Brunswick, Ohio, United States (since 1998)
  Poznań, Poland (since 2006)
  Assen, Netherlands (since 2006)
  Călărași, Romania (since 2007)
  Thessaloniki, Greece (since 2008)

References

External links
 the news from Razgrad and Razgrad district
 Razgrad municipality website
 Actual photos of Razgrad

 
Populated places in Razgrad Province